Newport Football Club could refer to:

Newport Civil Service F.C.
Newport County A.F.C.
Newport (IOW) F.C.
Newport Pagnell Town F.C.
Newport YMCA A.F.C.
Newport RFC